Alan Garcia (born October 2, 1985) is a  Peruvian thoroughbred horse racing jockey.  He was Peru's leading apprentice jockey in 2003 and in that same year he began racing in the United States at the Meadowlands Racetrack where he was also the leading apprentice.  His father and grandfather were both jockeys in Peru.  He is currently married and lives in Port Saint Lucie, Florida, with his wife and 3 sons. Garcia got his big break in 2007 when he won the Breeders' Cup Filly & Mare Turf. This was his first ever Breeders' Cup ride. The win, on Lahudood, meant that he was the third jockey ever to win his first Breeders' Cup race in his first attempt.

Garcia is currently one of the top jockeys on the Canadian Thoroughbred scene at Canada's most prestigious track Woodbine. 
Garcia rode Regal Ransom to a win at the $2 million 2009 UAE Derby in Dubai, leading the race from start to finish.

Garcia is a resident of Tinton Falls, New Jersey.

References

Sources
NYRA Biography, Page 109
NTRA Biography

External links
Belmont win easily jockey's biggest
Second choice pays off

Year-end charts

1985 births
Living people
American jockeys
Sportspeople from Lima
People from Tinton Falls, New Jersey
Peruvian jockeys
Peruvian emigrants to the United States